The BBC Audio Drama Awards is an awards ceremony created by BBC Radio to recognise excellence in the radio industry, in particular in audio dramas. The inaugural awards were presented in 2012 and the ceremony hosted at the BBC Radio Theatre, Broadcasting House where it has remained ever since.

The awards were first announced with an invitation for entries on 24 October 2011, and the shortlisted nominees revealed on 10 January 2012. The inaugural ceremony took place on 29 January 2012 and proved hugely successful. Prior to this, there was no official awards ceremony to recognise audio dramas; the Sony Radio Academy Awards mainly encompassed radio shows and presenters while the Richard Imison Award (for best original script by a new writer) and Tinniswood Award (for best audio drama script of the year) were awarded separately. The Imison and Tinniswood Awards are now incorporated into the Audio Drama Awards, the former administered by the Society of Authors and the latter by both the Society of Authors and the Writers' Guild of Great Britain.

Nominations and judges
Although nominations are dominated by the BBC's in-house arts-oriented stations, particularly BBC Radio 3 and BBC Radio 4, entries are open to all makers of audio drama world-wide.

The judges include personalities from both the radio, acting and theatre industry and the literary world. Notable judges have included British dramatist Nell Leyshon, American novelist Stephen Wright, performance historian Viv Gardner, English actor Robert Bathurst, long-time producer and Director-General of the BBC Lord Hall, comedian Alexei Sayle, actress Imogen Stubbs and Royal Shakespeare Company associate director Rupert Goold.

Winners

2022
The ceremony took place on 25 March 2022 and covered audio dramas broadcast between 1 October 2020 and 31 October 2021 or first uploaded / published / released for free listening online during the same period. 2022 marked the return as an in-person event after COVID-19 restrictions were lifted, it also saw the return of the Best Supporting Performance and Lifetime Achievement awards after an absence of three years.

2021 

Due to the COVID-19 pandemic the ceremony was held virtually taking place on 26 March 2021 and covering audio dramas first broadcast between 1 October 2019 and 31 October 2020 – or first uploaded / published for free listening online during the same period. With the restrictions having also impacted programme-making a one-off The Year of Reinvention Award replaced the Best Director Award. For the third year in succession no awards for Lifetime Achievement or Best Supporting Performance were bestowed this year.

2020 

The ceremony took place on 2 February 2020 and covers audio dramas first broadcast between 1 October 2018 and 31 October 2019 – or first uploaded / published for free listening online during the same period. For the second year in succession no awards for Lifetime Achievement or Best Supporting Performance were bestowed this year.

2019 
The ceremony took place on 3 February 2019 and covers audio dramas first broadcast between 1 October 2017 and 31 October 2018 – or first uploaded / published for free listening online during the same period. 2019 was the year when an award for Best Director was introduced as was one for Best European Drama. No awards for Lifetime Achievement or Best Supporting Performance were bestowed in this year.

2018 
The ceremony took place on 28 January 2018 and covers audio dramas first broadcast in English in the UK between 1 October 2016 and 31 October 2017 – or first uploaded / published for free listening online in the UK during the same period. In 2018 the two awards for comedy were changed to become Best Scripted Comedy (Longform) and Best Scripted Comedy (Sketch show).

2017 
The ceremony took place on 29 January 2017 and covers audio dramas first broadcast in English in the UK between 1 October 2015 and 31 October 2016 – or first uploaded / published for free listening online in the UK during the same period.

2016 
The ceremony took place on 31 January 2016 and covers audio dramas first broadcast in English in the UK between 1 October 2014 and 31 October 2015 – or first uploaded / published for free listening online in the UK during the same period.

2015 
The ceremony took place on 1 February 2015 and covers audio dramas first broadcast in English in the UK between 1 October 2013 and 31 October 2014 – or first uploaded / published for free listening online in the UK during the same period. 2015 saw the two Best Supporting Performance awards merged once again into a single category covering both male and female performers, but introduced a new category; Best Debut Performance.

2014
The ceremony took place on 26 January 2014 and covers audio dramas broadcast between 1 October 2012 and 31 October 2013 or first uploaded / published for free listening online in the UK during the same period. The award for Best Scripted Comedy was split into two (Best Scripted Comedy Drama and Best Scripted Comedy – Studio Audience) and two new awards were introduced; the Lifetime Achievement award and the Outstanding Contribution award.

2013
The ceremony took place on 27 January 2013 and covered audio dramas broadcast between 1 October 2011 and 30 September 2012 or first uploaded / published for free listening online in the UK during the same period. The award for Best Audio Drama Award was split into two (Single Play and Serial) as was the award for Best Supporting Performance (Best Supporting Actor and Best Supporting Actress). The Innovation award was retired.

2012
The inaugural ceremony took place on 29 January 2012 and covered audio dramas broadcast between 1 October 2010 and 30 September 2011 or first uploaded / published for free listening online in the UK during the same period.

References

Audio Drama
BBC Radio
Radio drama awards
British radio awards